Husain Ali (born 31 December 1981) is a Bahraini retired football player known as Husain Pelé. He last played for Al-Shabab of Bahrain and was a former player for the Bahrain national team. He was top goalscorer in the Bahrain Premier League in 1998(16) & 2003(18).

International career
Husain Ali made his international debut as a 16-year-old on 3 October 1998 against Sudan national team and has since earned 101 appearances, thus entering FIFA's century club. He was Bahrain's all-time top scorer with 33 goals, before being surpassed by Ismail Abdul-Latif.

International goals

See also
 List of men's footballers with 100 or more international caps

References

External links
 

1981 births
Living people
Bahraini footballers
Bahrain international footballers
Bahraini expatriates in Qatar
Al-Muharraq SC players
Al-Gharafa SC players
Umm Salal SC players
Al-Rayyan SC players
Al-Shabab Club (Manama) players
2004 AFC Asian Cup players
Expatriate footballers in Qatar
Association football forwards
FIFA Century Club
Footballers at the 2002 Asian Games
Qatar Stars League players
Bahraini Premier League players
Asian Games competitors for Bahrain